Enrico Tazzoli is the name of more than one Italian submarine, named after Enrico Tazzoli, a 19th century Italian Patriot.

 , a  launched in 1935 and sunk in 1943.
 , a  acquired in 1954 and sold in 1972 for scrapping which previously had served in the United States Navy as USS Barb.

Italian Navy ship names